Stefan Gertel (born 12 May 1960) is a German boxer. He competed in the men's bantamweight event at the 1984 Summer Olympics. He was also the most probable West German runner-up for the 1980 Summer Olympics, but the West German government decided to join the U.S.-imposed boycott, so Gertel missed the event together with the rest of the FRG Olympic squad.

References

External links
 

1960 births
Living people
German male boxers
Olympic boxers of West Germany
Boxers at the 1984 Summer Olympics
People from Worms, Germany
Bantamweight boxers
Sportspeople from Rhineland-Palatinate